Fields Landing (formerly, South Bay, South Bay Station, and Adele) is a census-designated place in Humboldt County, California. The ZIP Code is 95537. The population was 276 at the 2010 census.

History
Before the arrival of European settlers, the area now known as Humboldt County was occupied by a number of indigenous peoples, including the Wiyot, Yurok, Hupa, Karuk, Chilula, Whilkut, and the southern Athabascans. Fields Landing is located within the original territory of the Wiyot tribe.

The first recorded entrance into Humboldt Bay occurred in 1806 by members of a Russian-American company from Sitka. The Josiah Gregg party arrived by land in December 1849, and by 1850 the first ships came to the bay bringing men seeking gold. As the Gold Rush subsided, the economy shifted to the use of the surrounding natural resources, mainly timber, salmon, and agricultural land. The area was a prime exporter of agricultural products from 1857 to 1900.

Fields Landing was named for Waterman Field, a resident of Humboldt County since 1861.  He established the town in 1862. Field owned 160 acres in what is currently known as Fields Landing.  Waterman Field built a dock there to ship his farm products and the name "Fields Landing" was derived from this landing place for ships.

Fort Humboldt, built in 1853 to protect settlers from retaliatory attacks and keep peace between the settlers and the natives, was a failure, as the garrison did neither successfully.  Indians were enslaved under the terms of the 1850 "Act for the Government and Protection of Indians" that provided legal basis for the continued Californio practice of capturing and using Native people as forced workers, particularly that of young women and children, which was carried on as a legal business enterprise.  Intrusion of professional hunters and settlers and their herds of cattle and pigs into the hunting and gathering areas of the natives in the interior led the reduction of their food supplies and native resistance to this began the Bald Hills War.  Development around the bay, disease, and the February 26, 1860 Indian Island Massacre, and consequences of the Bald Hills War, led to decimation of the peaceful Wiyot reducing their numbers from 3,000 to less than 100 survivors by 1865.

In the 1880s, docks were built in Fields Landing for shipping redwood and other timber. When the Northwestern Pacific Railroad was extended into the Humboldt Bay area in 1914, it functioned as a dike, and allowed the tidal marshes to be converted into agricultural lands. The construction of U.S. Route 101 in 1927 also created more fill, allowing most of the marshes to be drained and diked.

After World War II, a new Douglas fir and plywood industry brought in many out-of-state loggers and mill workers. From 1940 to 1951, a whaling station operated in Fields Landing. However, the timber industry continued to dominate life in the community into the 1970s. The demise of the timber industry in the 1980s forced a fresh perspective on resource use. New groups of people began to arrive, namely Hispanic workers and families, and refugees from the Vietnam War.

Demographics

2010
The 2010 United States Census reported that Fields Landing had a population of 276. The racial makeup of Fields Landing was 210 (76.1%) White, 6 (2.2%) African American, 13 (4.7%) Native American, 21 (7.6%) Asian, 1 (0.4%) Pacific Islander, 6 (2.2%) from other races, and 19 (6.9%) from two or more races. Hispanic or Latino of any race were 18 persons (6.5%).

The Census reported that 276 people (100% of the population) lived in households, 0 (0%) lived in non-institutionalized group quarters, and 0 (0%) were institutionalized.

There were 136 households, out of which 27 (19.9%) had children under the age of 18 living in them, 28 (20.6%) were opposite-sex married couples living together, 13 (9.6%) had a female householder with no husband present, 8 (5.9%) had a male householder with no wife present.  There were 27 (19.9%) unmarried opposite-sex partnerships, and 2 (1.5%) same-sex married couples or partnerships. 59 households (43.4%) were made up of individuals, and 5 (3.7%) had someone living alone who was 65 years of age or older. The average household size was 2.03.  There were 49 families (36.0% of all households); the average family size was 2.84.

The population was spread out, with 43 people (15.6%) under the age of 18, 35 people (12.7%) aged 18 to 24, 91 people (33.0%) aged 25 to 44, 76 people (27.5%) aged 45 to 64, and 31 people (11.2%) who were 65 years of age or older.  The median age was 36.8 years. For every 100 females, there were 133.9 males.  For every 100 females age 18 and over, there were 130.7 males.

The homeowner vacancy rate was 2.3%; the rental vacancy rate was 5.1%.  95 people (34.4% of the population) lived in owner-occupied housing units and 181 people (65.6%) lived in rental housing units.

2000
According to the 2000 U.S. Census, Fields Landing had a total population of 213 people. About 83.1% of the inhabitants were White, 1% African American, 4.2% Native American, 2.3% Asian, and 0.5% Pacific Islander. A total of 4.7% identified with some other race and 4.2% with two or more races. Another 15% of the population identified themselves as having Hispanic or Latino origins. According to the 2000 U.S. Census, zero Fields Landing residents were foreign-born.

In 2000, Fields Landing was composed of 53.1% males and 46.9% females. The median age of the community was 29.8 years in 2000 as compared to the national average of 35.3 for the same year. The 2000 U.S. Census reports that 16.9% of the population was between the ages of 18 and 24, compared to the national average of 9.6%. The 55 and older age group represented 14.6% of the total population in 2000, while the national average for this age group was 21.1% for the same year.

The 2000 U.S. Census stated that 50% of the population 18 years and older received a high school degree as their highest educational attainment compared to the national average of 28.6%. In the community, 78% received a high school degree or higher, while 10% received a bachelor's degree or higher. According to the 2000 U.S. Census, zero residents of Fields Landing had received a graduate degree or higher compared to the national average of 7.8% for the same year.

Economy
The economic base of Fields Landing was founded on fishing and timber. The commercial fishing industry experienced a steep decline in recent years, and in 2013 the major industries are tourism and timber.

Fields Landing is located within the Port of Humboldt Bay Harbor, Recreation and Conservation District and the Port of Humboldt. Two shipping terminals are based in Fields Landing. Humboldt Bay Forest Products docks include one berth with a  wooden dock with two approach ramps. Fields Landing Terminal includes one berth with a  dock.  A public boat ramp provides boating access for smaller craft.

Commercial fishing
In 2000, of the 42 vessels that delivered to Fields Landing all were commercially registered. There was at least one seafood processing plant located here in 2000, whose shipments included $182,000 worth of crab and over $1.5 million worth of groundfish.

Fields Landing residents owned eight vessels in 2000, all of which participated in the federally managed groundfish fishery. Seven federally managed groundfish fishery permits were held by three Fields Landing residents in 2000.

Statistics
The 2000 U.S. Census indicates that 0% of the employed civilian population 16 years and over worked in the agriculture, forestry, fishing, and hunting industries. This percentage may not be indicative of the actual number of people in these professions as many are self-employed, especially in the fishing industry. A total of 7% worked in arts, entertainment, recreation, and accommodation and food services. Additionally, 8% worked in educational, health, and social services, while 9.9% were employed by the government. The 2000 U.S. Census states that the unemployment rate in 2000 was 22.6% (calculated by dividing the unemployed population by the labor force). For the population 16 years and older, 41.9% were not in the labor force, while 45% were employed.

According to the 2000 U.S. Census, in 1999 the median household income was $35,313 and the per capita income was $14,198. About 24.5% of the population was living below poverty level in 1999. Of the 95 housing units in 2000, 89.5% were occupied and 10.5% were vacant. Of the occupied housing units, 40% were owner occupied, while 60% were renter occupied.

Government

Infrastructure
Fields Landing is accessible by a number of transportation options. Amtrak, Redwood Transit, and Greyhound provide rail and bus service respectively from nearby communities to greater metropolitan areas throughout the country. The major highway that intersects Fields Landing is U.S. Highway 101.  Despite common misconceptions to the contrary, it is the only roadway into Fields Landing.

Education
Students attend local elementary, middle, and high schools in the nearby community of Eureka.  Although the College of the Redwoods main campus is technically inside Eureka City Limits, Fields Landing is the nearest community to the college by road.  Electricity is provided to community residents by Pacific Gas and Electric. Water and sewer services are supplied by Humboldt Community Services District. The Humboldt County Sheriff Department provides local law enforcement. The closest healthcare facility, St. Joseph Hospital, is located nearby in Eureka. Fields Landing accommodations include one motel.  However, additional lodging is available in nearby communities.

See also

 Northwestern Pacific Railroad

References

External links

Census-designated places in Humboldt County, California
Census-designated places in California
1862 establishments in California
Populated coastal places in California